Gerard Quintana i Rodeja (born 27 November 1964) is a Catalan singer, songwriter, poet, novelist, actor, and radio and TV personality. He first came to prominence in 1986-2001 as the lead singer of the rock band Sopa de Cabra. Sopa de Cabra was one of the leading bands of the rock català genre. Since the dissolution of the band in 2001, Quintana has pursued a successful solo career. As a singer-songwriter, he completed five albums between 2003 and 2010, together with three in collaboration with Jordi Batiste, and a recent album (2014) with Xarim Aresté. He also writes and publishes poetry, and has written regularly as a journalist for online Catalan newspapers and journals. He appeared in the short film Diogenes, the dog. Since the publication of his first novel in 2019 he is also establishing himself as a serious novelist. 

During the temporary reunion of Sopa de Cabra in 2011 to celebrate 25 years since the band's formation and ten since its final appearances, Quintana returned to his original rock-star style of singing and performance, and the concerts were based solely on the band's extensive existing repertoire. Since then, the band has reformed and released two albums of new songs in 2015 and 2020.

Quintana is also a well-known figure in Catalan culture quite apart from his musicianship. In recent years he has expressed his personal political and ideological views, including his support for Catalan independence. He is currently the President of the Acadèmia Catalana de la Música, an organisation dedicated to the interests of musicians of all kinds in Catalonia.

Musical career

Sopa de Cabra, 1986–2001 and 2011
In the mid-1980s, Quintana was a member of a group of young musicians, writers and artists based on a squat in Girona.  His role was initially more as a writer, both of poetry and in the journalistic sphere of producing fanzines, than as a singer and performer. Indeed, in a magazine interview published in 2010, Quintana revealed that in spite of his lifelong deep love of music, his initial youthful ambition was to be a writer, because as a child he was too shy to contemplate performing in public. He was involved with the bands Hasta los huevos de Mili and Ninyin's Mine Workers' Union band before the formation of Sopa de Cabra in the summer of 1986, when he became the new group's lead singer, as well as the most prolific writer of lyrics for its original repertoire. The influences on Sopa de Cabra's style included classic rock (the band's name was in homage to the Rolling Stones' 1973 album Goat's Head Soup), reggae, and blues, but the combination of the Catalan language and the creative originality of Quintana and his colleagues (Josep Thió, Joan 'Ninyín' Cardona, Francesc 'Cuco' Lisicic, and Pep Bosch) ensured that the band's sound was unique: authentic rock music and yet distinctively Catalan.

The years from 1989 to 2001 saw the release of 14 singles and 11 albums as well as regular concert tours. In 1991 Sopa de Cabra, along with three other leading Catalan bands, Sau, Els Pets and Sangtraït, took part in a major concert before an audience of 20,000 at the Palau Sant Jordi in Barcelona. This event is still regarded as a seminal moment in the popular music and culture of Catalonia.

For two or three years after the release of the album Mundo infierno in 1993, Sopa de Cabra lost some popularity, chiefly as a result of the controversy surrounding that album, which was recorded in Spanish rather than Catalan. The sensitivities concerning language in Catalonia are such that the use of Spanish angered and alienated many Catalan fans, without gaining Spanish-speaking ones.

By the late 1990s and with a change of record-label, the band was again at a peak of popularity, but other circumstances, notably the grave illness of Joan Cardona, led to the decision that the group would retire at the end of 2001. Cardona was able to make a brief appearance on stage in the final concert that was held in Barcelona in November 2001, but he died of cancer in the following January, aged 42. The concert was recorded and released on the 2002 CD/DVD Bona nit, malparits. The title (roughly, 'good night, bastards!') had long been Quintana's opening catch-phrase in live performances.

In March 2011, the surviving members of Sopa de Cabra announced a single anniversary reunion concert on September 9, 2011 to celebrate 25 years since the founding of the band, and ten years since its dissolution and final performances; the demand for tickets resulted in plans for a full tour of seven concerts, three in Barcelona, one each in Palma and Tarragona, and culminating with two, on 30 September and 1 October in the band's home town of Girona. The tour sold out in all seven venues, and was a resounding success. Quintana demonstrated that he had lost none of his rock-star charisma during the years performing in a more quiet and intimate style. The songs were all taken from the existing, classic repertoire of Sopa de Cabra, and the line-up was almost the same as that of the late 1990s, namely Josep Thió, Cuco Lisicic, Pep Bosch, Jaume Soler and Eduard Font. There was one addition; the guitarist, singer and songwriter Xarim Aresté, leader of the band Very Pomelo and representative of a younger generation of Catalan rock music, joined Sopa de Cabra.

The CD and DVD El retorn, which is the record of the 2011 tour, was released in December 2011, and the same year saw the release of two other CDs that chronicle the history of Sopa de Cabra, Re/Ebullació, bringing together all the group's singles releases from the 1980s and early 90s, and Els millors cançons, a 'best of' collection.

Solo career
In the late 1990s, while Sopa de Cabra was still actively touring and recording, Quintana also worked with Jordi Batiste, a respected Catalan musician of a slightly older generation, on Catalan covers of the work of Bob Dylan, one of Quintana's own major musical inspirations. As 'Miralls de Dylan' ('Mirrors of Dylan'), they released two albums (in 1998 and 2000), and in 2012, the collaboration continued with a series of concerts and a third CD.

Since the planned dissolution of Sopa in 2001–2002, Quintana has continued his career as a musician, writer, poet and actor. His first solo album was Senyals de fum ('Smoke signals'), in 2003. This was followed by another four successful albums and by many public performances, all in a personal and poetic style that contrasts in many ways with the traditional pop/rock music of Sopa. He has worked with many significant figures in Catalan music, including Francesc Bertran, Quimi Portet, Albert Pla, Pep Sala, Amadeu Casas, Pascal Comelade and the group Gossos.  His 2010 album, De terrat en terrat ('From roof to roof') amounts to a personal musical portrait of the city of Barcelona and its lively, multicultural ambience.

One of Quintana's more high-profile activities in 2013 was the part he took both in organising (as artistic director, with Lluís Danés) and performing in the Concert per la Llibertat (Concert for Freedom) held at the Camp Nou, Barcelona Football Club's ground, on 29 June 2013.  Though the keyword was 'freedom' rather than 'independence', the political sub-text was clear. In the first half of the concert, Quintana once again appeared with the old Sopa de Cabra line-up, performing Camins, one of the band's most famous songs.  Towards the end of the concert, accompanied by Xarim Aresté and Pascal Comelade, he sang the powerful and dramatic Lluís Llach song I si canto trist ('if my song is sad').

Collaboration with Xarim Aresté
Throughout 2013, Quintana's next project was taking shape. With Xarim Aresté he was composing new songs for an album that would be a return to rock music. During the summer, some of these songs were previewed in a low-key mini-tour called Només és rock'n'roll (It's only rock'n'roll'), and in the autumn, the new album was recorded. It was released under the title Tothom ho sap ('Everybody knows it') on 4 March 2014. The album consists of 13 new songs, plus two extra tracks available for download via Quintana's website. A concert tour to promote the album began in Barcelona on 21 March and continued at several venues throughout 2014. Quintana's stage presence remains as confident and energetic as in the old Sopa de Cabra days, and the collaboration with Xarim Aresté and a very talented band consisting of Sergi Carós, Joan Barbé, Ricard Sohn and Ermen Mayol has created a new force in Catalan popular music.

2015 onwards: the return of Sopa de Cabra

After the successful reunion and tour of 2011, questions about a future return of the band were avoided by its members, all of whom had musical and other projects of their own. But early in 2015, rumours of another reunion became widespread. On March 28, 2015, a surprise concert on a rooftop in Girona heralded news of the return of the band with new songs and a new album. A mini-tour of three concerts, featuring the new songs, took place in the summer of 2015, and the album, Cercles, was released at the end of 2015, and promoted in an extensive tour throughout 2016 and 2017. The year 2016 was the 30th anniversary of the founding of the band, and the 23 concerts of that year included one in Madrid and one in London. A live album, recorded at concerts in Girona and Porreres, was also released in 2018.

Another two years elapsed before the release of another album, La gran onada (‘The great wave’) in February 2020. A special open-air concert for a small invited audience took place at the great Graeco-Roman site of Empúries a few days before the record went on sale, and was filmed by the Catalan television Channel TV3. The lockdown in Spain in response to the COVID-19 pandemic came into force on 14 March 2020, the day on which the first concert of the promotional tour had been scheduled in Barcelona. However, some concerts were possible during the summer of 2020. The songs on the 2015 and 2020 albums that have now been added to the band's repertoire are all by the same songwriting team as the majority of those in their earlier catalogue, with music by Josep Thió and lyrics by Gerard Quintana.

Writing career

Although Quintana had regularly published articles in newspapers, it was not until April 2012 that he published his first full-length book, Més enllà de les estrelles ('Beyond the stars'), a personal account of the 2011 tour. It includes many autobiographical insights, and paints a picture of the complex organisation and hard work behind a rock tour. The book is illustrated with photographs by David Julià.

His second book was published in February 2015, an unexpected departure into a completely different literary genre: a story for young children. L’odissea de sant Jordi ('The Odyssey of Saint George') is an original take on the legend of Saint George (the patron saint of Catalonia) with charming illustrations by Anna Clariana. The story blends the usual Catalan legend of the saint with elements of Greek mythology, such as a one-eyed giant and dangerously seductive Sirens. Quintana's Saint George is at first a very timid little boy who is continually frightened by the world around him. But he embarks on a journey alone to try to face up to his fears and conquer them, armed only with a book, symbolising knowledge, and a rose, symbolising love. The magical power of music also enters into the story, and the song that assists Jordi when he finally encounters the dragon is a real one, written and performed by Quintana and Aresté, that can be downloaded via the publisher’s website or by way of a QR code printed within and on the back cover of the book.

In March 2019, Quintana’s first full-length novel, Entre el Cel i la Terra (‘Between heaven and earth') was published. A second hardback edition was printed in the same year, and at present (2021), the work is available in hardback, paperback and in audio and e-book formats. It is an account of complex personal and family relationships set chiefly in Barcelona and Girona from 1952 to the end of the 20th century.

Quintana wrote his second novel in 2020, during the restrictions caused by the COVID-19 pandemic, which greatly affected the band's planned concert tour to promote their new album. The book, L’home que va viure dues vegades ('The man who lived twice') was published in March 2021, and is the recipient of the Ramon Llull Novel Award for 2021, a prestigious prize awarded each year for literary fiction in the Catalan language.

Film
In 2014, Quintana took the lead part in a short film, written, directed and produced by Mateu Ciurana, entitled Diògenes, el gos (Diogenes, the dog).  Filmed in Caldes de Malavella, the film transfers the legendary meeting between the 4th-century BC Greek philosopher Diogenes and the young Alexander the Great into a modern setting. The script incorporates many of the sayings of the Cynic philosopher and the anecdotes about him that have been passed down since antiquity.

Discography

With Sopa de Cabra 
Sopa de Cabra (1989)
La Roda (1990)
Ben endins (1991) (live recording)
Girona 83-87: Somnis de Carrer (1992)
Mundo infierno (1993)
Al∙lucinosi (1994)
Sss…  (1996)
La nit dels anys (1997) (live)
Nou  (1998)
Dies de carretera (2000)
Plou i fa sol (2001)
Bona nit, malparits!  (2002) (live)
El llarg viatge (2003) (live)
El Retorn (2011) (CD and DVD of the anniversary tour)
Les millors cançons (2011) (a 'best of' compilation)
Re/Ebullació (2011) (the 14 Sopa de Cabra singles from 1989-1992, with a DVD of the 1991 concert at the Zeleste)
Cercles (2015)
La nit dels Sopa (2018) (live, recorded at concerts in Girona on 9 December 2017, and Porreres (Mallorca) on 12 August 2016)
La Gran Onada (2020)

With Jordi Batiste
Els miralls de Dylan (1998)
Sense reina ni as (2000)
Forever young / Per sempre jove (2012)

As solo artist
Senyals de fum  (2003)
Les claus de sal  (2004)
Per un tros de cel (2005)
Treu banya (2007)
De terrat en terrat  (2010)

With Xarim Aresté
Tothom ho sap (2014)

Books
Més enllà de les estrelles (2012) (Account of the 2011 tour)
L’odissea de sant Jordi (2015)  (Children's book)
Entre el Cel i la Terra (2019)  (Novel)
L’home que va viure dues vegades (2021) (Novel)

References

External links

 Archived version of former official website
  A television interview from 2010, discussing Quintana's life, opinions, interests and work

Living people
Singers from Catalonia
Novelists from Catalonia
Poets from Catalonia
Male film actors from Catalonia
People from Girona
Catalan-language singers
Songwriters from Catalonia
1964 births
Male television actors from Catalonia
Música Global artists
Catalan-language writers